Tara Fickle is an American professor. In 2020, she won an American Book Award for her book, The Race Card: From Gaming Technologies to Model Minorities (2019).

She graduated from Wesleyan University and the University of California, Los Angeles. She teaches at the University of Oregon.

Works 
 From the plantation to the prison : African-American confinement literature, Macon, Ga. : Mercer University Press, 2008. 
 Aiiieeeee! An Anthology of Asian American Writers, Seattle : University of Washington Press, 2019. 
 The Race Card: From Gaming Technologies to Model Minorities, New York : New York University Press, 2019.

References

External links
 Old tax, new name, KUOW, January 14, 2020
 UO Today: Tara Fickle Nov 11, 2014

Living people
University of Oregon faculty
Year of birth missing (living people)
Place of birth missing (living people)
Wesleyan University alumni
University of California, Los Angeles alumni